The Nancy Wilson Show! is a 1965 live album by Nancy Wilson, recorded at the Coconut Grove nightclub in Los Angeles.

Track listing 
 "Fireworks" (Betty Comden, Adolph Green, Jule Styne) – 2:29
 "Don't Take Your Love from Me" (Henry Nemo) – 3:29
 "Don't Talk, Just Sing" (Sammy Cahn, Jimmy Van Heusen) – 4:41
 "Guess Who I Saw Today" (Elisse Boyd, Murray Grand) – 4:21
 "Ten Good Years" (Martin Charnin, Luther Henderson) – 4:21
 "The Saga of Bill Bailey" (R. Harget, Henderson) – 6:21
 "The Music That Makes Me Dance" (Bob Merrill, Styne) – 3:58
 "I'm Beginning to See the Light" (Duke Ellington, Don George, Johnny Hodges) – 2:30
 "You Can Have Him" (Irving Berlin) – 6:20

Personnel 
 Nancy Wilson – vocals
 Butch Stone - bass clarinet, baritone saxophone
 Bob Davis - clarinet, alto saxophone
 Fred Haller
 Abe Aaron - tenor saxophone
 Jim Hall - bass trombone
 Miles Anderson - trombone
 Bob Clark - trumpet
 Don Smith
 Jules Vogel
 Stumpy Brown - tuba, bass trombone
 Ronnell Bright - piano, musical director
 Buster Williams - double bass
 Kenny Dennis - drums

References 

Nancy Wilson (jazz singer) live albums
1965 live albums
Capitol Records live albums
Albums produced by Michael Cuscuna